This is a list of United States ambassadors appointed by the 45th president of the United States, Donald Trump.

Ambassadorships are often used as a form of political patronage to reward high-profile or important supporters of the president. The most visible ambassadorships are often distributed either in this way or to the president's ideological or partisan confreres. Most ambassadorships, however, are assigned to foreign service officers who have spent their career in the State Department. Regardless, all ambassadors must be formally appointed by the president and confirmed by the Senate. While all ambassadors serve at the president's pleasure and may be dismissed at any time, career diplomats usually serve tours of roughly three years before receiving a new assignment; political appointees customarily tender their resignations upon the inauguration of a new president.

44% of Trump's appointees were political, a substantially higher percentage than typical. As of October 2018, 92% of Trump's appointees were white and 74% were male, with zero black women.

Key
CD, or career diplomats, denotes ambassadors who were appointed from the foreign service.

PA, or political appointees, denotes ambassadors who were not appointed from the foreign service.

Ambassadors to foreign states

Ambassadors to international organizations

United States Mission to the United Nations

Other international organizations

Ambassadors-at-large

Trade representatives

Other positions with rank of ambassador

Career ambassadors

Unsuccessful nominations

Notes

See also 
 List of ambassadors appointed by Joe Biden

References

External links 
 Chiefs of Mission by Country
 Chiefs of Mission to International Organizations
 American Foreign Service Association

2010s politics-related lists
 Ambassadors
 Trump